Ranton may refer to the following places: 

 Ranton, Staffordshire, a village in England
 Ranton, Vienne, a village in France

Ranton may also refer to the Shaolin disciple turned video game reviewer on YouTube.